Passiflora bryonioides, the cupped passionflower, is a plant in the genus Passiflora, family Passifloraceae. It is native to northern Mexico (Sonora, Chihuahua, Sinaloa and Guanajuato) and the south-western United States (Arizona).

The plant is an annual, tendril-forming vine up to 2 m tall, with palmately-lobed leaves. Flowers are white with purple stripes along the petals. Fruits are pale green and ovoid.

References

bryonioides